Mazhdeh Ali (also Romanized as Mazhdeh ʿAlī) is a village in Haviq Rural District, Haviq District, Talesh County, Gilan Province, Iran. At the 2006 census, its population was 122, in 30 families.

References 

Populated places in Talesh County